The Journal of Zhejiang University Science A: Applied Physics & Engineering is a monthly peer-reviewed scientific journal covering applied physics and engineering.

Abstracting and indexing 
The journal is abstracted and indexed in the Science Citation Index Expanded, Scopus, and Inspec. According to the Journal Citation Reports, the journal has a 2015 impact factor of 0.941.

References

External links 
 

Monthly journals
Engineering journals
Publications established in 2000
English-language journals
Zhejiang University Press academic journals
Springer Science+Business Media academic journals
Physics journals